Thomas Oscar "Tod" Davis (July 24, 1924 – December 31, 1978) was an American professional baseball player of the 1940s and 1950s.

During his trials with the Athletics, Davis collected 21 hits. His only big-league home run, hit September 5, 1949, came off Vic Raschi of the New York Yankees at Shibe Park during a 13–4 New York victory. The remainder of Davis' nine-year career (1943–44; 1947–53) was spent in the top-level Pacific Coast League. He appeared in 782 games in the PCL for both Los Angeles-based teams, the Angels and the Hollywood Stars, as well as for the Seattle Rainiers.

Davis served in the United States Army during World War II and its aftermath, and missed the 1945–46 seasons.

References

External links
, or Retrosheet

1924 births
1978 deaths
Baseball players from Los Angeles
Hollywood Stars players
Los Angeles Angels (minor league) players
Major League Baseball infielders
Minor league baseball managers
Philadelphia Athletics players
Seattle Rainiers players
United States Army personnel of World War II